is a railway station in Hyōgo-ku, Kobe, Hyōgo Prefecture, Japan, operated by the West Japan Railway Company (JR West).

Lines
Hyōgo Station is served by the Sanyo Main Line (JR Kobe Line), and also forms the terminus for the Wadamisaki Line branchline.

Station layout

History 
Station numbering was introduced to the Kobe Line in March 2018 with Hyōgo being assigned station number JR-A64.

Adjacent stations

References

External links

Sanyō Main Line
Railway stations in Kobe
Railway stations in Japan opened in 1888